The 2017 Big South Conference men's soccer tournament, was the 34th edition of the tournament. It determined the Big South Conference's automatic berth into the 2017 NCAA Division I Men's Soccer Championship.

The defending champions, Radford, were eliminated in the semifinal round in a penalty shoot-out against Presbyterian.

Qualification 

The top six teams in the Big South Conference based on their conference regular season records qualified for the tournament.

Bracket

Results

Quarterfinals

Semifinals

Final

All-Tournament team 
 Ricardo Hernandez, MF, Presbyterian (MVP)
 Sergio Pinto, MF, Presbyterian
 Adrian Edo Martin, MF, Presbyterian
 Connor Behrend, GK, Presbyterian
 Rashid Tetteh, D, High Point
 Jonathan Bolanos, F, High Point
 Johnny Fenwick, D, High Point
 Pepe Segarra, MF, Liberty
 Kevin Mendoza, MF, Liberty
 Fraser Colmer, D, Radford
 Myles Yorke, D, Radford
 Jake Beyer, GK, Gardner-Webb
 Ian Rees, MF, Campbell

See also 
 Big South Conference
 2017 NCAA Division I men's soccer season
 2017 NCAA Division I men's soccer tournament
 2017 Big South Conference Women's Soccer Tournament

References

External links 
 Big South Soccer Tournament Central
 Big South Tournament Bracket

Big South Conference Men's Soccer Tournament
Big South Conference Men's Soccer
Big South Conference Men's Soccer
Big South Conference Men's Soccer Tournament